The 1925 Beloit football team was an American football team that represented Beloit College during the 1925 college football season. In Tommy Mills' sixth season as head coach at Beloit, the team compiled a 6–2 record, and outscored their opponents 124 to 44.  One notable game for the college was against Notre Dame, who was coming off a consensus championship the year prior, and had shut out their last two opponents.  Although Beloit lost 19–3, they were praised for putting up any points at all.

Schedule

References

Beloit
Beloit Buccaneers football seasons
Beloit Buccaneers football